"Tonight Again" is a song by Australian recording artist Guy Sebastian. The song represented Australia in the Eurovision Song Contest 2015. It premiered on 16 March 2015, before the Eurovision entry deadline and it was released as a single on digital platforms on 7 April. The song was co-written and recorded by Sebastian specifically for the Eurovision Song Contest 2015 in only a week. "Tonight Again" appears as the final track on the European edition of Sebastian's eighth studio album, Madness.

A Swedish version of the song titled "Du och jag igen" was performed by Gina Dirawi and Sarah Dawn Finer on 27 February 2016 during an interval act as part of the Swedish process for selecting its Eurovision Song Contest entry, Melodifestivalen.

Background and composition
At a press conference held at the Sydney Opera House on 5 March 2015, it was announced that the Australian public broadcaster, Special Broadcasting Service (SBS), had internally selected Guy Sebastian to represent Australia at the 2015 Eurovision Song Contest. On 16 March, Sebastian's song for the Eurovision Song Contest was officially revealed online by SBS through the release of a music video for "Tonight Again".

The song was written within a week by Sebastian specifically for the Eurovision Song Contest. He collaborated with fellow songwriters David Ryan Harris and Louis Schoorl who he had previously worked with on other projects. On the choice of the song, Sebastian said, "When it came time to decide on a song, I thought since I had a couple of days off in Australia I would try and write something new. But if I was to record a new song I wanted it to be homegrown and organic with my band in my studio. Truly, we jumped in the studio and let it happen because I wanted to write something fun! We all have moments you don't want to end and you wish you could live those moments every day so I wanted to write a song about that feeling. I am sure that is how I am going to feel when I am in Vienna performing."

Track listing

Charts

Weekly charts

Year-end chart

Certifications

Release history

References

Guy Sebastian songs
Eurovision songs of Australia
Eurovision songs of 2015
2015 songs
2015 singles
Songs written by Guy Sebastian
Songs written by Louis Schoorl
Songs written by David Ryan Harris
Columbia Records singles
Sony Music singles